Central Semitic languages are one of the three groups of West Semitic languages, alongside Modern South Arabian languages and Ethiopian Semitic languages. 

Central Semitic can itself be further divided into two groups: Arabic and Northwest Semitic. Northwest Semitic languages largely fall into either Aramaic or Canaanite languages (such as Phoenician and Hebrew).

Overview
Distinctive features of Central Semitic languages include the following:
 An innovative negation marker *bal, of uncertain origin.
 The generalization of t as the suffix conjugation past tense marker, levelling an earlier alternation between *k in the first person and *t in the second person.
 A new prefix conjugation for the non-past tense, of the form ya-qtulu, replacing the inherited ya-qattal form (they are schematic verbal forms, as if derived from an example triconsonantal root q-t-l).
 Pharyngealization of the emphatic consonants, which were previously articulated as ejective.

Different classification systems disagree on the precise structure of the group. The most common approach divides it into Arabic and Northwest Semitic, while SIL Ethnologue has South Central Semitic (including Arabic and Hebrew) vs. Aramaic.

The main distinction between Arabic and the Northwest Semitic languages is the presence of broken plurals in the former. The majority of Arabic nouns (apart from participles) form plurals in this manner, whereas virtually all nouns in the Northwest Semitic languages form their plurals with a suffix. For example, the Arabic بَيْت bayt ("house") becomes بُيُوت buyūt ("houses"); the Hebrew בַּיִת bayit ("house") becomes בָּתִּים bāttīm ("houses").

References 

 

 
Semitic languages